Shelton Vineyards is a vineyard located in Dobson, North Carolina. Of over 95 North Carolina wineries, Shelton Vineyards is the largest family-owned estate winery in North Carolina. Located in the Yadkin Valley near Mt. Airy, the estate is  acres. The Shelton Vineyards' wines are reflective of the terroir of the Yadkin Valley. Shelton Vineyards has produced many award-winning wines.

History

Shelton Vineyards is located in Dobson, North Carolina  It took its present form for the first time in 1994, when Charlie and Ed Shelton bought the property that is just a few miles from where the two brothers grew up.  They have a  winery building and approximately  acres of vines are planted in the vineyard. Located in the Yadkin Valley AVA, the vineyard shares a similar climate and growing season to several wine growing regions in Europe.

In 2002, they asked the BATF to name the Yadkin Valley as an American Viticultural Area. In 2003, it received final ATF approval, becoming the first AVA in North Carolina.

Grapes

The list of grapes harvested includes:

Cabernet Franc
Cabernet Sauvignon
Chardonnay
Merlot
Malbec
Petit Verdot
Riesling
Sauvignon blanc
Tannat
Viognier

References

External links 
 
 Shelton Vineyards in Dobson NC

Wineries in North Carolina
Buildings and structures in Surry County, North Carolina
Tourist attractions in Surry County, North Carolina
Vineyards